Otoha is a feminine Japanese given name.

Otoha can be written using different kanji characters and can mean:
, "maiden, feathers"
, "maiden, leaf"
, "sound, feathers"
, "sound, leaf"
The name can also be written in hiragana or katakana.

People
 Otoha (actress) (b. 1981), a Japanese tarento and gravure idol

Characters

Otoha, the protagonist of in Karas anime
Otoha, a character in the Genesis of Aquarion (OVA)
Otoha Sakurano, a main character in the Sky Girls anime
Otoha Shinjo, a character in the light novel and manga series Marriage Royale
Otoha Takanashi, a character in the Pretty Rhythm: Rainbow Live
Otoha, a character in 'H2O: Footprints in the Sand'' series

Japanese feminine given names